Hồ Phúc Tịnh (born 28 April 1994) is a Vietnamese footballer who plays as a forward for V.League 1 club Sông Lam Nghệ An.

References 

1994 births
Living people
Vietnamese footballers
Association football forwards
V.League 1 players
Song Lam Nghe An FC players
People from Nghệ An province